Norway participated at the 2010 Winter Olympics in Vancouver, British Columbia, Canada. Norway sent 99 competitors to the games and ended up with the fourth largest number of gold medals among participating nations.

Medalists 

|width="70%" align="left" valign="top"|

|width="30%" align="left" valign="top"|

Alpine skiing 

Note: In the super combined, run 1 is the downhill, and run 2 is the slalom.

Biathlon 

Men

Women

Cross-country skiing 

Men

Sprint

Women

Sprint

Curling

Team: Thomas Ulsrud (skip), Torger Nergaard, Håvard Vad Petersson, Christoffer Svae, Thomas Løvold (alternate).

Much attention was paid to the team's pants, in the international media and on social media networks. The men wore pants with a red, white and blue diamond pattern from Loudmouth Golf. The pants were picked for the team by second Chris Svae.

Summary

Men's tournament

Standings

Round-robin
Norway had a bye in draws 3, 8 and 11.

Draw 1
Tuesday, 16 February, 09:00

Draw 2
Tuesday, 16 February, 19:00

Draw 4
Thursday, 18 February, 09:00

Draw 5
Thursday, 18 February, 19:00

Draw 6
Friday, 19 February, 14:00

Draw 7
Saturday, 20 February, 09:00

Draw 9
Sunday, 21 February, 14:00

Draw 10
Monday, 22 February, 09:00

Draw 12
Tuesday, 23 February, 14:00

Semifinal
Thursday, 25 February, 14:00

Gold medal game
Saturday, 27 February, 15:00

Freestyle skiing 

Men

Women

Ice hockey

Men's tournament 

Roster

Group play 
Norway played in Group A.
Round-robin
All times are local (UTC-8).

Standings

Final rounds 
Qualification playoff

Nordic combined 

Note: 'Deficit' refers to the amount of time behind the leader a competitor began the cross-country portion of the event. Italicized numbers show the final deficit from the winner's finishing time.

Skeleton

Ski jumping

Snowboarding 

Halfpipe

Snowboard cross

Speed skating 

Men

Women

Team pursuit

See also 
 Norway at the 2010 Winter Paralympics

References

Further reading

External links

2010 in Norwegian sport
Nations at the 2010 Winter Olympics
2010